Catalina Berroa Ojea (28 February 1849 – 23 November 1911) was a Cuban pianist, music teacher and composer. Cuba's first female conductor. María Catalina Prudencia Román de Berroa Ojea “Catalina Berroa” Trinidad, Las Villas, Cuba. Una mujer que se constituyó en un patrimonio histórico de la enseñanza musical, reconocida también como la primera mujer que dirigió una orquesta en la isla de Cuba. She was the first female conductor in Cuba and mastered seven instruments.

Life and career
Catalina Berroa was born in Trinidad, Las Villas, and studied with local teachers to master several instruments. She operated a music academy in Trinidad where she taught students including her nephew, pianist and composer Lico Jimenez. She also worked as organist in the Church of St. Francis of Assisi, and as organist and choir conductor of the Holy Trinity Church.

Berroa played cello in a trio with Manuel Jimenez on violin and Ana Luisa Vivanco on piano. She also performed as violinist of the Brunet Theater orchestra.

Works
Berroa composed songs, guarachas, hymns and liturgical and sacred music. Selected works include:
Song The Trinity, 1867
Song, Song of Belisa and Josefa, 1902
Condemned, The Talisman, Consciousness, The appeal, Rosa Gentile, all voice and guitar
Guaracha Cerro De La Habana, cat's dinner
Conchita March
May Flowers Church Music, for horn and piano
The Virgin of Cuba, for chorus
Osalutaris, for voice and organ
Save for two voices, for voice and organ
Cecilia Waltz for piano and band
The black Michael and Flowers, for piano

Her music has been recorded and issued on media, including:
''Vocal Recital: Provedo, Lucy - PALAU, R.L./SANCHEZ, J.P./DE BLANCK, H./ANCKERMANN, C./AGUERO, G./JIMENEZ, J.M. (La Perla) Colibri CD-091

References

1849 births
1911 deaths
19th-century American composers
19th-century American pianists
19th-century American women pianists
19th-century classical composers
19th-century classical pianists
19th-century women composers
20th-century American composers
20th-century American pianists
20th-century American women pianists
20th-century classical composers
20th-century classical pianists
20th-century women composers
African-American classical composers
American classical composers
African-American classical pianists
African-American women classical composers
African-American music educators
American classical pianists
American women classical composers
American music educators
American women music educators
Cuban classical composers
Cuban classical pianists
Cuban women pianists
Women classical pianists
19th-century American women musicians
African-American women musicians
20th-century African-American women
20th-century African-American people
20th-century African-American musicians